Bivouac is the second studio album by American punk rock band Jawbreaker, released through Tupelo Recording Company and The Communion Label on December 1, 1992. While promoting their debut album Unfun (1990) on a ten-week tour of the United States, the band had new material that they wished to work on through their shows. They ended up breaking up after the tour's conclusion, though later regrouped in 1991 to write new songs. From June 1991, they wrote material and practiced several times a week, in the lead up to recording sessions in October 1991. Sessions were helded at Razor's Edge in San Francisco, California with producers Billy Anderson and Jonathan Burnside. Categorized as an emo, punk rock, and pop-punk release, it had elements of the work of Helmet, Naked Raygun and early Smashing Pumpkins, and took influence from the Midwestern and Washington, D.C. post-punk scenes.

Bivouac was met with favorable reviews from music critics, many of whom praised its varied sound, while others commented on the change of direction from Unfun. In the lead up to the album's release, "Chesterfield King" was released in May 1992, which was promoted with a US East Coast tour. After a few months, frontman Blake Schwarzenbach started suffering from issues with his throat; while touring in Europe, he underwent surgery in London to remove a polyp that had formed on his vocal chords. He returned to singing five days later and had to break in his voice, which had shifted two octaves higher. Bivouac was reissued through drummer Adam Pfahler's label Blackball Records in 2012, and has since been re-pressed on vinyl twice.

Background and recording
Jawbreaker released their debut studio album Unfun in May 1990 through Shredder Records, which was promoted with a ten-week tour of North America. During it, vocalist and guitarist Blake Schwarzenbach said that they had new material that they wanted to work on through their live performances. This contrasted their previous working method of recording songs as soon as they finished them. Bassist Chris Bauermeister enjoyed the touring experience, but noted that it was a strain on the personal relationships between them. It reached a point where he was not talking to drummer Adam Pfahler and Schwarzenbach. While the tour helped establish the band on the national punk touring circuit, the tensions saw them break up upon returning home. After this, Bauermeister and Schwarzenbach returned to New York University, which was followed by several months without communication. During this period, Bauermeister attended a show at CBGB, and started a conversation with an attendee. The person was disappointed that Jawbreaker had broken up, which was the first that Bauermeister had heard of this news, and the first time since their tour that he had thought of the band in general.

In December 1990, Bauermeister completed his bachelor's degree, with Schwarzenbach getting his some months afterwards. After coaxing from their friends, Bauermeister and Schwarzenbach reconnected and decided to work on the band again. With education finished, the trio relocated to the Mission District of San Francisco, California in mid-1991 to write new material. Following this, they played 25 shows in local areas alongside Fugazi and Green Day. Between June and September 1991, the band wrote the majority of the tracks that would end up on their next album. They practiced several times a week at a rehearsal space in Tenderloin, San Francisco, leading up to recording sessions in October 1991. They recorded at Razor's Edge in San Francisco, California; they picked the studio as they were aware of other acts that had recorded there. The basic tracks of drums, bass and guitar were recorded in a three-or-four day period. Producer Jonathan Burnside was involved in these early sessions for only a day until he left the project, leaving it mainly to producer and engineer Billy Anderson. Anderson was previously an acquaintance and a fan of the band, knowing the members from the San Francisco scene.  Though Mike Morasky is credited as an producer, Anderson said he took on an engineering role. After a week's break, overdubbing commenced over two-or-three days. Anderson estimated that the sessions had cost the band under $5,000. They mixed the majority of the songs in the midst of the Oakland Hills fire, which they were unaware of until late in the day. "Ache" was recorded during the sessions, but was ultimately left unmixed when the track listing was being finalized.

Composition and lyrics

Overview
Musically, the sound of Bivouac has been described as emo, punk rock, and pop-punk, with elements of the work of Helmet, Naked Raygun and early Smashing Pumpkins. In his 33 1/3 book 24 Hour Revenge Therapy (2018) on the band, Ronen Givony said it was "slower, heavier, and gloomier in every way" compared to Unfun. He explained that Bivouac was a "set of sprawling, complex, deep-sea epics; angry, paranoid howls of despair; mournful, world-weary funeral dirges; and vivid, multipart revenge fantasies". Schwarzenbach equated the album's the sound to the work of Bob Mould, Mike Ness of Social Distortion, Evan Dando of the Lemonheads, Sinéad O'Connor, Guy Picciotto of Fugazi, and Dave Pirner of Soul Asylum. Kyle Ryan of The A.V. Club wrote that the band took influence from the Midwestern and Washington, D.C. post-punk scenes with the "angular rhythms, propulsive bass, noisy guitars, and a pronounced dark streak". Schwarzenbach and Lance Hahn of Cringer would talk about writing songs often; Hahn and Jawbreaker would hang out and listen to music together, which Schwarzenbach said would find its way into their songs.

The Free Lance–Star writer Brendan Fitzgerald said it was a lyrically "dark and aggressive" album that conveys "faithlessness and despair, punctuated with plateaus of romantic rejoicing". Andy Greenwald, author of Nothing Feels Good: Punk Rock, Teenagers, and Emo (2003), wrote that the lyrics were taken from Schwarzenbach's diaries, which saw the focus shift towards him: "The attraction then was to the songwriter; it wasn't the song that the listeners related to, it was the singer". In contrast to the band's later releases which were entirely written by Schwarzenbach, Bivouac has been described as Jawbreaker's "most collaborative" album. The lyrics to "Sleep", "P.S. New York Is Burning" and "Like a Secret" were written by Bauermeister, while "Parabola" was a collaborative effort between all three band members. Narrative samples are heard in three of the album's tracks, namely "Donatello" (from The Twilight Zone), "Like a Secret" and "Bivouac"; Pfahler said the instrumental sections that the samples were laid over were influenced by Bitch Magnet and Sonic Youth. The album's title, Bivouac, was taken from the sample used in "Bivouac", which was from a nature documentary on ant colonies. Pfahler explained that the narrator discusses bivouacs: "temporary encampments that the ants build out of their living bodies to protect the queen. We thought it apt, as our move to S.F. felt a bit like a bivouac".

Tracks
A re-recorded version of "Shield Your Eyes" starts Bivouac, fading in after 15 seconds of droning. An earlier version of it had been included on a various-artist compilation that their previous label, Shredder Records, had released in 1989. The song describes a person choosing to stare at a sidewalk instead of looking directly at the sun to risk going blind. In the feedback-laden "Big", a wordsmith finds himself incapable to discuss his emotions. "Chesterfield King" sees the narrator contemplating loving someone; he describes an encounter with a homeless woman at a 7-Eleven. Mischa Pearlman of Louder said after this exchange, he "pits the folly and freedom of youth against the experience and wisdom of age, while also confronting the human mortality head on". With "Donatello", a creative process is employed as an analogy for a doomed relationship; it is followed by the art punk track "Face Down".

"Tour Song" discusses being on the road; they had written it prior to the 1990 North American trek. It opens with an answering machine recording from Schwarzenbach addressed to his girlfriend. The song is followed by two covers: "You Don't Know..." (1980), originally recorded by Joan Jett, and "Pack It Up" (1981), originally recorded by the Pretenders. Discussing audience reactios in an interview, Schwarzenbach said "Pack It Up" acted as a reference towards people that would ask for them to play older material that they no longer played. He said "Parabola", which has a Jesus Lizard-esque bassline, was a track for "mean people". The lyrics in it were influenced by the work of Jack Kerouac and talks about self-loathing. The album concludes with the experimental track "Bivouac", which lasts for ten minutes and amalgamates the various musical elements from across the rest of the songs. AllMusic reviewer Fred Thomas described it as: "dialling in the swirling basslines and big grunge choruses with beat poet-inspired lyrics aiming to reconcile Holden Caulfield-esque displacement and alienation from immediate family".

Release
Hahn previously worked at Revolver Distribution, which worked with several labels in a warehouse in San Francisco, such as Tupelo Recording Company and The Communion Label. Hahn convinced Gary Held from Revolver to sign Jawbreaker; Hahn told the band that they should talk to Held as he liked their new material. Revolver was based in the UK, which was hoped to give the band better distribution in Europe for their upcoming releases. "Chesterfield King" was released in May 1992; it featured "Tour Song", "Face Down", "You Don't Know..." and "Pack It Up". As all of the material would not fit on a single LP, it was spun off into the EP. Pfahler said splitting the songs ultimately delayed their forthcoming album. That same month, the Eugene Register-Guard reported that Bivouac would be released in three months' time. They embarked on a US tour that Pfahler booked himself, which was dubbed Hell Is on the Way, and saw them trek along the East Coast. Five days into it, Schwarzenbach blew his voice during a show in Kalamazoo, Michigan. After five songs, he left the stage; the following day, he visited a doctor, who found a polyp on his vocal chords. Schwarzenbach explained that it would require surgery and a two-week resting period to fully recover.

They held a meeting and decided that their roadie Raul Reyes would stand in for Schwarzenbach for the remainder of the tour, and potentially for the first two weeks of an upcoming European trek. After the following show, however, Reyes forgot the lyrics and Schwarzenbach started singing again. By August 1992, Schwarzenbach was becoming cautious about his voice as it had "gotten progressively worse" over the three prior shows, which he attributed to the new songs being "very vocal oriented". Ahead of the European tour, they contacted Lookout! Records staff member Christy Colcord, who would act as their booking agent and tour manager for the duration of it. She explained that they were unsure whether to fly out to the continent, against the orders of Schwarzenbach's doctor. Concerned about the potential lose of money from not doing it, alongside the members' enthusiasm for wanting to do it, they ultimately embarked on the tour. Three weeks into it, while in Ireland, Schwarzenbach began coughing up blood; by this point, Colcord decided to take him to a hospital. In October 1992, he underwent surgery in London to remove the polyp.

Though the doctors recommended he take a ten-day break, he started singing again after five days while in Norway. He noticed that his voice was two octaves higher, resulting in him breaking it back to what he previously sounded like. After the tour was over, Pfahler and Schwarzenbach lived in their van, as both had quit their jobs and moved their possessions into storage. Sometime later, Pfahler was forced to get arthroscopic knee surgery and then was diagnosed with Thoracic outlet syndrome. Bivouac was released on December 1, 1992 through the Tupelo and Communion labels; it was intended to be released two months earlier, but as Held was busy touring Europe with DUH, this left the labels inoperable during the interim. Pfahler attributed the delay to Held holding it back in order to sell off all of the copies of the "Chesterfield" twelve-inch vinyl, in addition to the time it took to create the artwork. The cassette and LP releases of Bivouac have an album cover featuring a drawing of a topless woman with a rabbit mask. The cover of the CD release is a portion of the image showing the band name and album title; the full drawing is revealed when the insert is unfolded. The image was done by artist Brendan Murdock. The album marked the last appearance of the band's 4F logo, which had first appeared on their debut seven-inch vinyl release. It came out around the time independent punk music was being glossed over in favor of the burgeoning grunge scene. 

To coincide with the album's 20th anniversary, it and "Chesterfield King" were re-pressed on vinyl in 2012 through Pfahler's label Blackball Records. The CD version included "Peel It the Fuck Down" and a cassette rough version of "Ache" as bonus tracks; the former lifted from the band's compilation album Etc. (2002), while a different version of the latter appeared on their following studio album, 24 Hour Revenge Therapy (1994). According to the accompanying press release, both releases were remastered by John Golden and the "increased sampling rate boosts some of the Low-frequency effects and mid-range". Pfahler explained that he wanted a more accurate sonic portrayal of what they heard in the studio. As they were working from DATs to a digital medium, the "sampling rate now is twice what it was in 1992". Blackball Records has since re-pressed it on vinyl in 2015 and 2017.

Reception

Several reviewers praised the album's varied sound. Givony referred to it as the their "most stylistically varied and leftfield" release, full of "dense layering and experimentation of dramatic" instrumentals and vocal samples. In a review for Record Collector, Pearlman explained that the album's identity revolved around its "varied and experimental take on punk's aesthetic". Fitzgerald said that what it "lacks in production quality, it compensates for in stuttering tempo changes and fills", coming across as a "heart-wrenching example of perfect musical clarity". Adam Turner-Heffer of God Is in the TV felt that it "proved the band’s ambition beyond being just a punk rock band [...] push[ing] the already rapidly expanding boundaries they had presented previously". Rock Hard writer Buffo Schnadelbach said the band eschewed the thrash metal and funk-inspired sound of other bands in San Francisco in lieu of "punk-noisy indie guitar rock". Thomas called it "easily their stormiest, gruffest material"; Melissa Fossum of Phoenix New Times said that the "super-dense" musicality made it "one of the hardest albums to get into, but it's great in the context of Jawbreaker".

Other critics commented on the songwriting and the change from Unfun. Jim Testa of Trouser Press noted that while it dropped the "playful brightness" of their debut, it continued their "formula of literate, well-crafted pop songs filled with unpredictable breaks and changes". Brandon Stosuy of Pitchfork said it was their "darkest collection, a sprawling, shaggy-dog set that found them transitioning from the cleaner, calmer Unfun to something grittier, wilder, and smarter". Alternative Press writer Vivianne Oh said that the album showcases a band "progressing with tunes that crackle with alienation and burning chunks of aggressive guitar", highlighting Schwarzenbach's growth as a lyricist. Dan Fidler of Spin praised the trio's individual abilities; Ryan attributed the musicianship to all of the members being "equally invested in the songwriting". Author Andrew Earles wrote in his book Gimme Indie Rock: 500 Essential American Underground Rock Albums 1981–1996 (2014) that it "exuded a maturity years beyond not only its debut, but beyond many" of their peers.

Legacy and accolades
In the aftermath of the album's release, Greenwald wrote that Schwarzenbach's charisma as a frontman "helped establish Jawbreaker as a national touring act"; in addition to this, the band, with their "dominant voice and searingly personal POV, produced emo's first idol". Joe Gross of Spin said that Bivouac and 24 Hour Revenge Therapy were "two of early emo's key documents"; editors Cindy Dell Clark and Simon J. Bronner expressed a similar statement in Youth Cultures in America (2016). Chaz Kangas of Spectrum Culture wrote that Jawbreaker provided a specific sound in "such a way that contemporary bands still have an audible chunk of the album in their collective DNA". Ryan said that in the ensuing years, Jawbreaker subverted the darker edge of Bivouac with the brighter-sounding 24 Hour Revenge Therapy, and would return to it on Dear You (1995) without the ambitious songwriting. Fitzgerald said the "sheer musical fortitude and lyrical passion [...] make this album a cornerstone of underground rock music" in the vein of the Pixies and the Promise Ring. In an Alternative Press interview promoting Dear You (1995), Schwarzenbach critiziced the album as being a "scattered multi-personality travesty". 

Cleveland.com ranked "Chesterfield King" at number 16 on their list of the top 100 pop-punk songs. The track has similarly appeared on best-of lists for Jawbreaker songs by Alternative Press, God Is in the TV, Louder and Stereogum. LA Weekly included Bivouac at number nine on their list of the Top 20 Emo Albums in History. Several of the songs have been covered for different tribute albums over the years: "Bivouac" by the Goodboy Suit for So Much for Letting Go: A Tribute to Jawbreaker Vol. 1 (2003); and "Shield Your Eyes" by For Amusement Only and "Chesterfield King" by Nerf Herder for Bad Scene, Everyone's Fault: Jawbreaker Tribute (2003). Gordon Withers covered "Chesterfield King" and "Bivouac" for his album Jawbreaker on Cello (2019), which came about from his involvement in the Jawbreaker documentary Don't Break Down (2017).

Track listing 
All songs written by Jawbreaker, except where noted. The following is the CD listing; the vinyl version omits "Tour Song", "Face Down", "You Don't Know..." and "Pack It Up".

References
Citations

Sources

External links

Bivouac at YouTube (streamed copy where licensed)
 Dusting ‘Em Off: Jawbreaker – Bivouac at Consequence
 Analysis of "Chesterfield King" in Inventory by The A.V. Club

1992 albums
Jawbreaker (band) albums